Vidyavihar, also spelled Vidya Vihar, is a railway station on the Central Line of the Mumbai Suburban Railway network. It serves the Vidyavihar suburban area. It has two platforms and is generally busy during college hours. Vidyavihar falls between the stations Kurla and Ghatkopar.

History 

Vidyavihar station opened up in 1961, after the Great Indian Peninsular Railway (GIPR) was renamed to Central Railway. It is located in the vicinity of the Somaiya Vidyavihar from which it derives its name. A nursery, railway hostel and staff quarters were built in the 1960s and 1970s, flanking the station on both sides. However, they were soon razed down to make way for new tracks.

References

Railway stations opened in 1865
Mumbai CST-Kalyan rail line
Railway stations in Mumbai Suburban district
Mumbai Suburban Railway stations